The Hyde Park Barracks are in Knightsbridge in central London, on the southern edge of Hyde Park. They were often known as Knightsbridge Barracks and this name is still sometimes used informally.

History

Its first buildings were constructed for the Horse Guards in 1795, and a riding school and stables designed by Philip Hardwick were added in 1857. These were replaced with new ones designed by Thomas Henry Wyatt on which construction started in 1878 and was completed in May 1880.

These were in turn demolished to make way for modernist buildings by Sir Basil Spence, completed in 1970. It was built to accommodate 23 officers, 60 warrant officers and non-commissioned officers, 431 rank and file, and 273 horses. The most prominent feature is a 33-storey,  residential tower, which is one of the two most prominent modern buildings as seen from Hyde Park along with the London Hilton on Park Lane. It was built by Sir Robert McAlpine between 1967 and 1970.

The barracks are the base for the Household Cavalry Mounted Regiment, which is horsed and carries out mounted (and some dismounted) ceremonial duties on state and royal occasions in London. These duties include the provision of a Sovereign's Escort, most commonly seen at the late Queen's Birthday Parade (Trooping the Colour) in June each year. Other occasions include important ceremonies that take place during state visits by visiting heads of state, or whenever required by the British monarch. The regiment also mounts the King's Life Guard at Horse Guards, which consists of one squadron from each regiment.

Reception
The building has been described by the magazine, Country Life, as "dramatically modern and uncompromising", but many people have viewed it less favourably; it was voted number eight in a Country Life poll of Britain's "top ten eyesores". Lord St John of Fawsley remarked that "Basil Spence's barracks in Hyde Park ruined that park; in fact, he has the distinction of having ruined two parks, because of his Home Office building, which towers above St. James's Park".
Critic A. A. Gill described the Barracks as the ugliest building in London, and said that Spence "managed to construct vertical bomb damage out of horizontal bomb damage."

'I did not want this to be a mimsy-pimsy building', Spence is reported as saying. 'It is for soldiers. On horses. In armour'. He also felt that a tower would cut out less light to the park than a slab block, and would block fewer upper-storey views of the Royal Park from buildings to the south.

In 2015 the C20 charity which campaigns for the preservation of architectural heritage applied to have the building listed. Their bid was endorsed by Historic England, but was rejected by Culture minister Tracey Crouch.

Based units 
The following notable units are based at Hyde Park Barracks.

British Army 
Household Cavalry

 Household Cavalry Mounted Regiment

References

External links
Knightsbridge Barracks at the Survey of London

Installations of the British Army
Skyscrapers in the City of Westminster
National government buildings in London
Barracks in London
Basil Spence buildings
Brutalist architecture in London
Buildings and structures completed in 1970
Household Cavalry
Knightsbridge
20th-century architecture in the United Kingdom
1970 establishments in England
Residential skyscrapers in London